Soundarya Jayamala is an Indian actress and daughter of actress Jayamala. Soundarya made her starring debut in Godfather with Upendra. Her second film was Paru Wife of Devadas. She then entered Tollywood with a leading role in Mr. Premikudu with Yasho Sagar.

Filmography

References

.

Indian film actresses
Living people
Actresses in Kannada cinema
Actresses in Telugu cinema
Actresses from Bangalore
21st-century Indian actresses
Year of birth missing (living people)